is a former Japanese football player. He played for Japan national team.

Club career
Takahara was born on October 14, 1957. After graduating from high school, he joined Mitsubishi Motors in 1976. In 1978, the club won all three major title in Japan; Japan Soccer League, JSL Cup and Emperor's Cup. The club also won 1980 Emperor's Cup and 1981 JSL Cup. He retired in 1981. He played 64 games and scored 15 goals in the league.

National team career
In March 1980, Takahara was selected Japan national team for 1980 Summer Olympics qualification. At this qualification, on March 22, he debuted and scored a goal against South Korea. He played 4 games and scored 2 goals for Japan in 1980.

Club statistics

National team statistics

References

External links
 
 Japan National Football Team Database

1957 births
Living people
Japanese footballers
Japan international footballers
Japan Soccer League players
Urawa Red Diamonds players
Association football forwards